Following is a list of senators of Cher, people who have represented the department of Cher in the Senate of France.

Third Republic

Senators for Cher under the French Third Republic were:

Henri Fournier (1876–1885)
Louis Rivière (1876–1885)
Jean Girault (1885–1909) Died in office
Valentin Peaudecerf (1885–1903)
Louis Pauliat (1887–1915) Died in office
Charles Daumy (1903–1910) Died in office
Antony Martinet (1909–1921)
Émile Bonnelat (1910–1921)
Hippolyte Mauger (1920–1939)
Christophe Pajot (1921–1929) Died in office
Jules-Louis Breton (1921–1939)
Marcel Plaisant (1929–1945)
Henri Laudier (1930–1943) Died in office
André Breton (1939–1945)

Fourth Republic

Senators for Cher under the French Fourth Republic were:

René Cherrier (1946–1948)
Gustave Sarrien (1946–1952) Died in office
Marcel Plaisant (1948–1958) Died in office
Charles Durand (1952–1959)

Fifth Republic 
Senators for Cher under the French Fifth Republic:

References

Sources

 
Lists of members of the Senate (France) by department